Su böreği 'water börek' is one of the most common types. Sheets of dough are boiled briefly in large pans, then a mixture of beyaz peynir or künefe peyniri and parsley (or in an alternative recipe minced meat, onions, tomato sauce) and oil is scattered between the layers. The whole thing is brushed with butter and laid in a masonry oven to cook. it may be thought of as a drier, less saucy version of the Italian lasagna.

Regional Su Böreği Styles
 
Adana Su Böreği
Konya Su Böreği

References

Turkish pastries
Cheese dishes